NGC 5030 is a barred spiral galaxy in the constellation Virgo. The object was discovered on 17 March 1881 by the American astronomer Edward Singleton Holden.

See also 
 List of NGC objects

References

Notes

Barred spiral galaxies
5030
045991
Virgo (constellation)